Charles Edward "Red" Phillips (May 10, 1917 – March 29, 2005) was a Canadian professional ice hockey defenceman who played 17 games in the National Hockey League for the Montreal Canadiens. He was born in Toronto, Ontario.

External links

1917 births
2005 deaths
Canadian ice hockey defencemen
Montreal Canadiens players
Ice hockey people from Toronto
Toronto Young Rangers players
Washington Lions players